Calliandra pilosa is a species of legume in the family Fabaceae.
It is found only in the country of Jamaica.

References

pilosa
Flora of Jamaica
Vulnerable plants
Endemic flora of Jamaica
Taxonomy articles created by Polbot